Glen Waverley is a suburb in Melbourne, Victoria, Australia,  east of Melbourne's Central Business District, located within the City of Monash local government area. Glen Waverley recorded a population of 42,642 at the 2021 census.

History

The area was first settled in the mid nineteenth century and later developed as orchards and farming lands. The Post Office opened on 1 July 1885 as Black Flat in the area to the south of the railway line, was renamed 'Glen Waverley' in 1921, and Glen Waverley South in 1963 on the same day Glen Waverley North office (open since 1954) was renamed Glen Waverley (from 1994 The Glen). The name "Waverley" comes from a novel by Sir Walter Scott.

Major development occurred in the 1950s to 1970s with rapid infilling of housing built to a generally high standard on large (typically 800m2) blocks. In particular Legend Park Estate was opened by Hooker Rex in 1971. Much of that housing stock is now ageing and renewal is occurring, frequently involving subdivision of the larger blocks into townhouse development. The suburb was also the site of Victoria's first McDonald's restaurant, which opened on 12 September 1973, at the corner of High Street and Springvale Road. It was opened shortly after the original in Sydney. Following the Sydney McDonald's closure, it became Australia's longest surviving McDonald's until it was demolished in 2016, and subsequently replaced with a modernised version.

Geography

One of the largest suburbs in Melbourne by land area, Glen Waverley is bounded by the Dandenong Creek to the east, Waverley Road and View Mount Road to the south-east, Ferntree Gully Road to the south, Blackburn Road to the west and Highbury Road to the north. Springvale Road, a major north–south distributor, divides the suburb. The geography varies from river flats adjacent to the Dandenong Creek in the east to hilly in the region between the Dandenong Creek and the Scotchmans Creek (a small first-order tributary of the Yarra River) catchments.

Economy

Glen Waverley has also developed to become somewhat of a business hub in metropolitan Melbourne, with many international companies including Toshiba, Ansell, and NEC all having their Australian headquarters in the suburb.

Nicknamed "The Centre of the Universe" by the local Chinese residents due to its convenient location, ample amenities, good weather, and favourable living conditions, Glen Waverley had the seventh highest number of one million dollar-plus house sales in Melbourne in 2013. Properties in Glen Waverley and surrounding areas continued to show price gains in 2014 and 2015, largely due to interest from Chinese property buyers.

Glen Waverley is the only place in Oceania which has been included in the list of places referred to as the Center of the Universe.

Demographics

In the 2016 Census, there were 40,327 people in Glen Waverley. 30.9% of people were born in Australia. The next most common countries or regions of birth were China 15.5%, India 9.4%, Malaysia 5.5%, Sri Lanka 9.3% and Hong Kong SAR 2.4%. 40.5% of people spoke only English at home. Other languages spoken at home included Mandarin 19.3%, Cantonese 8.5%, Sinhalese 7.8%, Tamil 7.8% and Hindi 2.3%. The most common responses for religion were No Religion 32.3%, Catholic 24.3%, Buddhism 10.0% and Hinduism 7.8%.

Politics and representation

Most of Glen Waverley's voting booths are within the federal electorate of Bruce (with the remainder in Chisholm). The suburb is traditionally oriented towards the Liberal Party, but has become extremely marginal and competitive in recent years. 

This is evidenced in the 2010 federal election results, in which the combined booth results for the suburb produced a primary vote of 40.7% for the Labor Party, 46.0% for the Liberals, and 9.8% for the Greens. After preferences, the split was 49.99% for Labor and 50.01% for the Liberals (a difference of 3 votes).

In 2019 Australian federal election, the electorate which Glen Waverley is part of, Division of Chisholm, saw both major parties being represented by Chinese-Australian female candidates, Gladys Liu and Jennifer Yang, respectively for Liberal and Labor parties. Liu defeated Yang by 1,090 votes (a margin of 1.1%), in an extremely close race. 

The 2020-21 State electoral boundary redivision has seen the creation of the new electoral district of Glen Waverley.  Glen Waverley takes in most of the abolished seat of Forest Hill, large parts of abolished Mount Waverley, and small parts of Ringwood and Mulgrave. It was an estimate Liberal margin of 0.9% compared to 1.1% for abolished Forest Hill.

Facilities

The main street of Glen Waverley is Kingsway. In recent years, Kingsway has developed into a vibrant dining and entertainment area, with strong Asian influences.  Also on Kingsway is Century City Walk, a cinema multiplex. It houses various eateries, a Strike Bowling Bar and a Village Cinema (equipped with Gold Class facilities). There are now many hotels such as Novotel Glen Waverley, Hotel Ibis, Waverley International Hotel, Apartments of Waverley and the Quest Hotel. There is also a large branch of the Monash Public Library Service.

High-rise apartment blocks began featuring with the construction of IBIS Hotel, constructed at the southern end of Kingsway and bordering Springvale Rd. In 2011, IKON Glen Waverley was constructed as a 10-storey apartment, office, retail and car parking complex between the railway station and Kingsway. In 2016, the next multi-storey residence apartment block was announced for 52-54 O'Sullivan Rd, to replace the former The Walk Arcade complex. This project was finally completed in September 2019. The period 2015-2019 also saw major reconstruction work of The Glen which incorporates the Sky Garden apartment complex. Sky Garden was completed in 2019 with residents moving in just prior to COVID in early 2020.

The suburb also has numerous churches, and is home to the Victoria Police Academy, which occupies a former Roman Catholic seminary. Located on and adjacent to Kingsway is also the Monash Council Building and Glen Waverley Library.

The Glen (formerly known as "Centro The Glen") is a local regional shopping centre owned, (formerly managed and developed by Vicinity Centres). Although smaller than nearby shopping centres such as Westfield Knox or Chadstone, The Glen has continually grown and evolved. In 2015, plans were announced for a $500M redevelopment which was completed 2019 just prior to COVID and the prolonged shutdown periods that Melbourne endured. Major retail tenants of the current shopping centre include David Jones, Target, ALDI, Coles, Woolworths, UNIQLO, H&M, JB Hi-Fi, Chemist Warehouse and Spotlight. A major feature of the redevelopment, besides the 3 Sky Garden apartment towers, is the fine dining/restaurant precinct. Today Vicinity The Glen has a reputation of being a fine dining and up-market retail experience. The relocation of the food court to the north-east corner has enabled diners to enjoy views looking out to Mt Dandenong.

Education

Glen Waverley is the home of what is considered Victoria's best and one of Australia's best non-selective co-educational public schools, Glen Waverley Secondary College.

Primary schools
 Camelot Rise Primary School
 Glendal Primary School
 Glen Waverley Primary School
 Glen Waverley South Primary School
 Highvale Primary School
 Mount View Primary School

Secondary schools
 Brentwood Secondary College
 Glen Waverley Secondary College
 Highvale Secondary College

Private schools
 St Christopher's Primary School
 St Leonard's Primary School
 Wesley College (Glen Waverley Campus)

TAFE
 Holmesglen Institute of TAFE (Glen Waverley Campus)

Sport

The suburb has two Australian rules football clubs, Glen Waverley Hawks Football Club, and the Glen Waverley Rovers Junior Football Club both competing in the Eastern Football League.

Soccer clubs include Glen Waverley Soccer Club (founded in 1980), and Waverley Victory Football Club (founded in 2001), they are both members of Football Federation Victoria.

Tennis clubs include Glen Waverley Tennis Club, Glenvale Tennis Club, Glenburn Tennis Club, Legend Park Tennis Club, Notting Hill Pinewood Tennis Club and Whites Lane Tennis Club.

Cricket is represented by the Glen Waverley Cougars Cricket Club and the Glen Waverley Cricket Club, who both compete in the Southern District and Churches Cricket League (SDCCL). In season 2009/2010, the Glen Waverley Cricket Club's 50th year, they won the SDCCL Menzies Shield, defeating Mount Waverley Uniting Cricket Club. The Glen Waverley Hawks Cricket Club compete in Wilson Shield of the Box Hill Reporter District Cricket Association. The Richmond cricket club trading as the Monash tigers are the main cricket club in the area playing Victorian Premier cricket. have been at central reserve since 2011 and were at punt road oval since 1854.

Golfers play at the course of the Glen Waverley Golf Club at Waverley Road in the neighbouring suburb of Wheelers Hill.

Glen Waverley has a major recreational and aquatic centre located on Waverley Rd, the Monash Aquatic and Recreation Centre (MARC). It has a range of different swimming pools to cater for everyone's needs with two kid pools, a 40-metre wave pool, a Learn-to-swim pool, an indoor 25-metre pool, an outdoor 50-metre pool and a hydrotherapy pool.

M1 Swimming Club (formerly Waverley Amateur Swimming Club before 2002) has existed at the Monash Aquatic and Recreation Centre (formerly Waverley Swimming Pool) since 1962. There is a large squad swimming program at the MARC which has been operated by Tateswim since 2001. Tateswim runs squads for competitive and non-competitive swimmers, with competitive swimmers racing under the M1 Swimming Club banner. M1 also has members training in squad programs at the Harold Holt Swim Centre (City of Stonnington) and the Glen Eira Sports and Aquatic Centre (City of Glen Eira).

Transport

Rail

The suburb gives its name to the Glen Waverley railway line, which terminates at Glen Waverley station. Services depart platform 1 and 2, with a frequency of 7–8 minutes in peak hour, and every 15 minutes in off-peak periods. Glen Waverley is classed as a Premium Station, is in Metro Zone 2.

Syndal railway station is located one station to the west of Glen Waverley railway station and also on the Glen Waverley railway line.

Glen Waverley is also a key stop in the proposed Suburban Rail Loop mega-project and the first East phase. Commuters will be able to transfer from the Glen Waverley railway station and travel south and alight at Monash University, Clayton or Cheltenham, or travel north towards Deakin University, Burwood and Box Hill. As of May 2022, the project nears the commencement of construction.

Bus
A number of bus routes operated by Ventura Bus Lines and CDC Melbourne also operate in the area, with connections to Monash University, Chadstone Shopping Centre, Eastland Shopping Centre, Westfield Knox, Rowville, St. Kilda, Glen Iris, Springvale, Blackburn, Mitcham, Dandenong and Croydon.
The 902 SmartBus from Chelsea to Airport West, also operates via Glen Waverley at 15-minute frequencies all day in both directions, and at up to 10-minute frequencies in peak periods.

Roads
Springvale Road is the main north–south arterial road running through Glen Waverley, with 3 lanes in each direction. Blackburn Road runs parallel to Springvale Road to the west.
High Street Road, Waverley Road and Ferntree Gully Road are the main east–west collector roads in Glen Waverley. 
The Monash Freeway also runs through the south-western corner of Glen Waverley, with access via Ferntree Gully and Springvale Roads.

Notable people
 Kevin Bartlett – AFL footballer
 John Blackman – Radio and television presenter; famed for Hey Hey It's Saturday
 Hamish Blake – Comedian and actor; famed for Hamish & Andy (radio show)
 Paula Duncan – Actress
 Paul Hester – Musician
 John Orcsik – Actor
 Phrase (Harley Webster) – MC/rapper
 Marina Prior – Singer
 Sir Garfield Sobers – Cricketer
 Shirley Strachan – Singer, songwriter, radio and television presenter; famed for Skyhooks
 Frank Woodley – Comedian
 Lin Jong - Australian Rules Football player

In popular culture

Glen Waverley served as the fictional suburb of Banksiawood in the 1988 ABC Television children's television series C/o The Bartons by Jocelyn Moorhouse. Some scenes were recorded in the Century City Walk mall, Village Cinema, Townsend Street and the library.

See also
 City of Waverley – Glen Waverley was previously within this former local government area.
 Glen Waverley railway station
 List of places referred to as the Center of the Universe

References

 
Suburbs of Melbourne
Suburbs of the City of Monash